"Blurry Eyes" is the second single by Japanese rock band L'Arc-en-Ciel, released on October 21, 1994. It reached number 22 on the Oricon chart. The title track appears on the soundtrack of the DNA² anime. The single was re-released on August 30, 2006 and reached number 12 on the Oricon chart. In 2012, Vince Neil covered the song for a tribute album.

Track listing

References

1994 singles
L'Arc-en-Ciel songs
Songs written by Tetsuya (musician)
Songs written by Hyde (musician)
1994 songs
Ki/oon Music singles